The 2011 FIFA Women's World Cup qualification UEFA Group 6 was a UEFA qualifying group for the 2011 FIFA Women's World Cup. The group comprised Russia, the Republic of Ireland, Switzerland, Israel and Kazakhstan. 

Switzerland won the group and advanced to the play-off rounds.

Standings

Results

External links
 Regulations of the European Qualifying Competition for the 6th FIFA Women's World Cup

6
2010 in Russian football
2009 in Russian football
2010 in Kazakhstani football
2009 in Kazakhstani football
2010 in Republic of Ireland women's association football
2009 in Republic of Ireland women's association football
2009–10 in Israeli women's football
2010–11 in Israeli women's football
2009–10 in Swiss football
2010–11 in Swiss football